The Kurukshetra Panorama and Science Centre is located next to Shrikrishna Museum in , Kurukshetra city, Haryana, India about 1.5 km from Kurukshetra railway station.

Exhibits
This is a two story building with several exhibits, which has been visited by 80 million visitors in 15 years till March 2016.
India-A Heritage in Science, Technology and Culture
lifelike Panorama of the epic battle of Kurukshetra
Science Park

See also

 Haryana State Museum at Panchkula
 Haryana Rural Antique Museum at HAU Hisar
 Jahaj Kothi Museum at Hisar fort
 Rakhigarhi Indus Valley Civilisation Museum near Hisar
 Sheikhpura Kothi near Hansi
 Dharohar Museum at Kurukshetra University
 Shrikrishna Museum at Kurukshetra
 Sheikh Chilli's Tomb at Kurukshetra 
 Rewari Railway Heritage Museum at Rewari railway station

References

External links
 Google location
 Kurukshetra Panorama and Science Centre website
 Kurukshetra Panorama and Science Centre Video

Kurukshetra
Museums in Haryana
Museums in Kurukshetra
Science museums in India